La seduzione, internationally released as Seduction, is a 1973 Italian erotic film, directed by Fernando Di Leo and based on the novel Graziella by Ercole Patti.

Plot
After many years working as a journalist in France, Giuseppe returns to the empty family home in his native Acireale and looks up his old flame Caterina, now a widow and mother of the teenage Graziella. A staid middle-aged romance is rekindled and he begins spending nights in her home. Graziella, though she has a local boyfriend, finds her mother's mature and sophisticated lover far more alluring and starts trying to entice him. 

Giuseppe succumbs to Graziella's charms bit by bit, and the affair has only just been consummated when Caterina finds out. Stormy arguments among the three end with a fragile truce, in which Giuseppe will not abandon Caterina. Unhappy that she has not won, Graziella gets her friend Rosina to tempt Giuseppe into a beach cabin and then rushes to tell her mother about this new infidelity. Dressing herself immaculately, Caterina waits outside Giuseppe's house until he emerges, when she shoots him dead.

Cast 
Lisa Gastoni as Caterina
Maurice Ronet as  Giuseppe
Jenny Tamburi as  Graziella
Pino Caruso as  Alfredo 
Graziella Galvani as  Luisa
Barbara Marzano as  Rosina
Rosario Bonaventura as  Rosario

Casting
Originally the character of Graziella was planned to be played by Ornella Muti, but she was eventually dropped because considered too attractive for the role.

Reception 
At the time of its release, the newspapers widely reported the news of a man who died of a heart attack watching the movie.

References

External links

1973 films
Films directed by Fernando Di Leo
Italian erotic drama films
Films scored by Luis Bacalov
Films set in Sicily
1970s erotic drama films
1970s Italian films